Neotrypaea is a genus of ghost shrimp in the family Callianassidae, containing the following five species:
Neotrypaea biffari (Holthuis, 1991)
Neotrypaea caesari (Heard & R.B. Manning, 2000)
Neotrypaea californiensis (Dana, 1854)
Neotrypaea costaricensis (K. Sakai, 2005)
Neotrypaea gigas (Dana, 1852)
Neotrypaea hainanensis (WL Liu & RY Liu, 2014)
Neotrypaea harmandi (Bouvier, 1901)
Neotrypaea japonica (Ortmann, 1891)
Neotrypaea makarovi (Marin, 2013)
Neotrypaea melissae (Poore, 2008)
Neotrypaea pacifica (Guzmán & Thatje, 2003)
Neotrypaea petalura (Stimpson, 1860)
Neotrypaea rochei (Bouvier, 1895)
Neotrypaea tabogensis (K. Sakai, 2005)
Neotrypaea thermophila (FJ Lin, Komai & TY Chan, 2007)
Neotrypaea uncinata (H. Milne Edwards, 1837)

References

Thalassinidea
Taxa named by Raymond B. Manning